Castle of Dreams may refer to:
 Castle of Dreams (1919 film), a British silent drama film
 Castle of Dreams (2019 film), an Iranian drama film